Enshi Grand Canyon is a natural scenic spot in Enshi, Hubei, China. It is located in the Qing River Basin, adjacent to the world's deepest sinkhole Xiaozhai Tiankeng. The total length of the canyon is about 35 kilometers, and almost all kinds of forms of karst landforms can be found, including cliffs, peak pillars, sinkholes, solutional caves, natural arches, subterranean rivers, hanging valleys, etc., constituting a rare three-dimensional karst landform. The Enshi Grand Canyon is under the management of the Enshi Grand Canyon Scenic Area Management Office, Enshi Mufu Office.

History 
In order to promote the rapid development of tourism in the region, the State Municipal Committee and the State Municipal Government decided to establish the Mufu Office, and on December 10, 2008, the Enshi Mufu Office was formally established and used two names, the Enshi Grand Canyon Scenic Area Management Office and the Enshi Mufu Office, ushering in a new development opportunity for the Enshi Grand Canyon.

Legend 
It is said that the single tower of rock was bestowed by a deity to the people as a stick of incense, which could be lighted when help was needed from the gods.

Gallery

References

Enshi Tujia and Miao Autonomous Prefecture